Since 1950, India has been hosting head of state or government of another country as the state guest of honour for Republic Day celebrations in New Delhi. During 1950–1954, Republic Day celebrations were organised at different venues (like Irwin Amphitheatre, Kingsway, Red Fort and Ramlila Maidan). It was only starting 1955 when the parade in its present form was organised at Rajpath. The guest country is chosen after a deliberation of strategic, economic and political interests. During 1950s–1970s, a number of Non-Aligned Movement and Eastern Bloc countries were hosted by India. In 1968 and 1974, India played host to two countries on the same Republic Day.

By continent, the invitations break up as follows:

By geographic region, the invitations break up as follows:

List of chief guests

Notes

References

Republic days
Chief guests at Delhi Republic Day parade